Mount Tupper  is a mountain about  west of Golden, British Columbia, Canada and three kilometres east of Rogers Pass in Glacier National Park. Part of the Selkirk Mountains, it was formerly named Hermit Mountain until renamed (1887) in honour of Sir Charles Tupper when he was minister of Railways and Canals in Sir John A. Macdonald's cabinet during the siting and construction of the CPR line through the Selkirk Mountains, and later Prime Minister.

Raspberry Rising Cave

In 2013, the mountain was the scene of cave explorations by a team of eight, led by Nicholaus Vieira and funded by the Royal Canadian Geographical Society, who followed the Raspberry Rising cave system for nearly a kilometre, climbing two waterfalls and traversing four sumps. The end of the cave was not reached and further explorations are planned.

Climate

Based on the Köppen climate classification, Mount Tupper is located in a subarctic climate zone with cold, snowy winters, and mild summers.

See also

Geology of British Columbia
Geography of British Columbia

References

External links
 Mount Tupper at bivouac.com
 "Mapping the Underworld," a 19-minute documentary by Carolyn Jarvis which takes the viewer inside Raspberry Rising Cave and shows how the expedition is assisting researchers in microbial studies (aired on Global Television on September 28, 2013). Note: most of the film is focused on Booming Ice Chasm.
 Parks Canada site: Glacier National Park
 Weather: Mount Tupper
 

Caves of British Columbia
Caves of Canada
Columbia Country
Two-thousanders of British Columbia
Selkirk Mountains
Kootenay Land District